The University of Music and Performing Arts Vienna (abbreviated MDW) is an Austrian university located in Vienna, established in 1817.

With a student body of over three thousand, it is the largest institution of its kind in Austria, and one of the largest in the world.

In 1817, it was established by the Society for the Friends of Music. It has had several names: Vienna Conservatory, Vienna Academy and in 1909 it was nationalized as the Imperial Academy of Music and the Performing Arts. In 1998, the University assumed its current name to reflect its university status, attained in a wide 1970 reform for Austrian Arts Academies. In 2019, the Universität für Musik und Darstellende Kunst Wien (MDW) was named one of the "best performing arts schools in the world" by the CEOWORLD magazine.

The university

With a student body of more than 3000, the Universität für Musik und Darstellende Kunst Wien (MDW) is one of the largest arts universities in the world. The University consists of 24 departments including the Max Reinhardt Seminar, Vienna Film Academy and the Wiener Klangstil.

MDW facilities include the Schönbrunn Palace Theater, Antonio Vivaldi Room, Salesian Convent, St. Ursula Church, Lothringerstrasse (Franz Liszt Room) and the Anton Von Webern Platz (university main campus). Modern film studios were completed on the university campus in 2004, offering the Vienna Film Academy modern equipment.

The University organizes around 10 competitions, including the International Beethoven Piano Competition. It also presents an acclaimed students’ film festival every two years.

The MDW may be considered a "feeder" institution to all major orchestras in Austria, with a particular association with the Vienna Philharmonic.

History
Calls for a music conservatory in Vienna started in 1808. In 1811 an "outline for a music education institution" for Vienna was published. A year later the Society for the Friends of Music was formed, with the foremost aim of establishing a conservatory. The Vienna Conservatory was founded in 1817. It was meant to be modeled on the Paris Conservatory, but, due to a lack of funds, it began solely as a singing school. Antonio Salieri was the Conservatory's first director. In 1819, it hired violinist Joseph Böhm, and by 1827 offered courses in most orchestral instruments.

The Conservatory's finances were very unstable. Tuition fees were introduced in 1829, but by 1837 the institution was bankrupt. The state eventually funded the Conservatory from 1841 to 1844 and from 1846 to 1848. In 1848 political unrest caused the state to discontinue funding, and the Conservatory did not offer courses again until 1851. With support from the state and the city, finances again stabilized after 1851. Despite growing state subsidy, The Society for the Friends of Music, which founded the Conservatory, remained in control of the institution. However, by a January 1, 1909 imperial resolution the school was nationalized and became the Imperial Academy of Music and the Performing Arts (k.k. Akademie für Musik und darstellende Kunst). (Until then its name was the Konservatorium der Gesellschaft der Musikfreunde.)

Until 1844, when Gottfried Preyer, professor of harmony and composition became director, the director of the Conservatory was not a member of faculty, but a member of the Society for the Friends of Music. Joseph Hellmesberger Sr. was director from 1851 to 1893.

From 1907 Wilhelm Bopp had been the director of Conservatory. The Conservatory was still dominated by the aging Robert Fuchs and Hermann Grädener, both of whom, but especially Fuchs, Bopp considered to be anachronistic and out of touch. In 1912, attempting to rejuvenate the Conservatory Bopp offered teaching positions to Franz Schreker and Arnold Schoenberg. Schoenberg declined the offer, but Schreker accepted it. His teaching duties were carried through with great success and by January 1913 he was awarded a full professorship.

Bopp was also instrumental in the 1909 nationalization of the Conservatory. The administration of the Academy was now assigned to a state-appointed president, an artistic director and a board of trustees.

After the end of World War I, the State Academy was again reorganized. President Karl Ritter von Wiener resigned and conductor Ferdinand Löwe was elected director by the teachers. In 1922, Joseph Marx took over. He wanted the Academy to be granted University status.

After the Anschluss, many teachers and students were dismissed on racial grounds. In 1941, the Academy became a Reich University (Reichshochschule). After World War II, the institution became a State Academy again. In the process of Denazification, fifty-nine teachers were dismissed; by November 1945, sixteen were reinstated. Only five of the teachers dismissed in 1938 were reinstated.

By laws introduced in 1948 and 1949 the institution was granted the status of "Art Academy". In 1970, the "Law on the Organization of Art Colleges" effectively gave all Art Academies University status, and in 1998 the title of "Art Academy" was changed to "Art University".

Institut für Komposition, Elektroakustik und TonmeisterInnen-Ausbildung aka ELAK is part of MDW and focuses on electroacoustic music, improvisation, composing of contemporary music, sound art.

Departments

Department of Composition and Electroacoustics (aka ELAK)
Department of Conducting
Department of Music Analysis, Theory and History
Department of Keyboard Instruments (Instrumental Programme)
Department of String Instruments (Instrumental Programme)
Leonard Bernstein Department of Wind and Percussion Instruments (Instrumental Programme)
Joseph Haydn Department for Chamber Music and Special Ensembles
Department of Organ, Organ Research and Church Music
Department of Voice and Music Theatre
Max Reinhardt Seminar Department of Drama
Film Academy Vienna Department of Film and Television
Department of Music Education
Department of Music and Movement Education 
Department of Music Therapy
Department of Stylistic Research in Music
Department of Popular Music
Ludwig van Beethoven Department of Keyboards in Music Education
Hellmesberger Department of Strings in Music Education
Franz Schubert Department of Wind and Percussion Instruments in Music Education
Antonio Salieri Department of Voice in Music Education
Anton Bruckner Department of Music Theory, Ear Training and Ensemble Direction
Department of Music Research and Ethnomusicology
Wiener Klangstil Department of Music Acoustics 
Department of Music Sociology
Department of Cultural Management and Cultural Studies

Notable past teachers

Joseph Böhm
Anton Bruckner
Ferruccio Busoni
Josef Dachs
Julius Epstein
Robert Fischhof
Robert Fuchs
Leopold Godowsky
Jakob Grün
Leopold Hager
Rotraud Hansmann
Hans Haselböck
Joseph Hellmesberger Sr.
Władysław Kędra, from 1 October 1957
Josef Krips
Hartmut Krones
Uroš Lajovic
Ferdinand Löwe
Mathilde Marchesi
Joseph Marx
Joseph Merk
Martin Gustav Nottebohm
Karl Österreicher
Anna Pessiak-Schmerling
Erwin Ratz
Max Reinhardt
Carole Dawn Reinhart
Hilde Rössel-Majdan
Antonio Salieri
Emil von Sauer
Simon Sechter
Franz Schalk
Arnold Schoenberg
Franz Schmidt
Franz Schreker
Richard Stöhr
Otmar Suitner
Hans Swarowsky

Mimi Wagensonner
Luise Walker
Felix Weingartner
Erik Werba

Notable alumni

Notes

Citations

External links 

Entry at the Oesterreichisches Musiklexikon ONLINE

 
Arts organizations established in the 1810s
Buildings and structures in Landstraße
Educational institutions established in 1817
Music in Vienna
Music schools in Austria